Selbbach (also: Selb) is a river of the Karlovy Vary Region, Czech Republic and Bavaria, Germany. Its source is west of the town Aš. It flows into the Ohře (Eger) near Selb.

See also
List of rivers of Bavaria

References

Rivers of the Karlovy Vary Region
Rivers of Bavaria
Rivers of Germany
International rivers of Europe